Petter Laukslett Tande (born 11 June 1985 in Oslo) is a Norwegian former nordic combined skier who has been competing between 2002 and 2011, representing Byåsen IL. He has three medals in the 4 x 5 km team event at the FIS Nordic World Ski Championships, with a gold (2005) and two bronzes (2007, 2009).

Competing in two Winter Olympics, he earned his best finish of fourth in the 15 km individual event at Turin in 2006.

He has six career World Cup victories, including twice at the Holmenkollen ski festival (Individual: 2006, sprint: 2008).

Personal information 
Petter Tande is 180 cm, weighs 68 kg. His birthday is the same as the Norwegian Queen. He has got blue eyes and brown hair. He loves watching movies, including Pirates of the Caribbean, and anything of action and western movies. His favourite actor is Johnny Depp. His family consists of mom Marianne and dad Torbjørn, and sister Ina Laukslett Tande.

References 
 
 Holmenkollen winners since 1892 - click Vinnere for downloadable pdf file 

1985 births
Holmenkollen Ski Festival winners
Living people
Nordic combined skiers at the 2006 Winter Olympics
Nordic combined skiers at the 2010 Winter Olympics
Norwegian male Nordic combined skiers
Olympic Nordic combined skiers of Norway
FIS Nordic World Ski Championships medalists in Nordic combined
Skiers from Oslo
21st-century Norwegian people